After a top-five play-off system was used, a play-off structure involving the top six teams was used to determine the winners of the Super League competition in British rugby league from 2002 through to 2008.

Apart from the grand final, all matches were staged at the home ground of the team placed higher in the final league table. A similar system was used by the Australian National Soccer League. The A-League uses the same system to determine its champions, but with a subtle difference outlined below.

From week two on, the top-six play-offs system reflects exactly the Page playoff system.

With the expansion of Super League from 12 teams to 14 for 2009, the number of teams making the play-offs increased from 6 to 8. For details of the new system, see Super League play-offs.

How it worked

Week one
 Elimination semi-final A: 3rd vs 6th
 Elimination semi-final B: 4th vs 5th

Week two
 Qualification final: 1st vs 2nd
 Elimination final: winners of elimination semi-final A vs winners of elimination semi-final B

Week three
 Preliminary final: losers of qualification match vs winners of elimination final

Week Four
 Grand final: winners of Qualification Match vs winners of Final Qualifier

The A-League system
(System used in season 2009/10, 2010/11,2011/12)
Week one
 Major semi-final leg 1: 2nd vs 1st
 Elimination semi-final A: 3rd vs 6th
 Elimination semi-final B: 4th vs 5th

Week two
 Major semi-final leg 2: 1st vs 2nd
 Minor semi-final : elimination semi-final A winner vs elimination semi-final B winner

Week three
 Preliminary final: loser of major semi-final vs winner of minor semi-final

Week four
  Grand final: winner of major semi-final vs winner of preliminary final

(System used after season 2012/13, which is also adopted to World Curling Championships since 2018):
Week one
 Elimination final A: 3rd vs 6th
 Elimination final B: 4th vs 5th

Week two
 semi-final A: higher ranked elimination final winner vs 2nd
 semi-final B: lower ranked elimination final winner vs 1st

Week three
 Grand final: higher ranked semifinal winner vs lower ranked semifinal winner

Competitions
In addition to the Super League, the top-six system is also used in the Championship and the Championship One, as well Rugby League Conference National. A modified method was used in the 2018 Australian domestic limited-overs cricket tournament.

See also
 McIntyre system
 Top five play-offs
 Page playoff system
 ARL final series

References

Tournament systems
Rugby league terminology